Ioan Bălan (11 February 1880 – 4 August 1959) was a Romanian bishop of the Greek-Catholic Church.

Biography
He was born in Teiuș, Alba County, the son of Ștefan Bălan and Ana, née Muntean. After graduating high school in Blaj, he studied theology in Budapest, and was ordained a priest in 1903. He continued his studies in Vienna, moved to Blaj and then in 1909 to Bucharest, where a Greek-Catholic confessor was needed. In 1919 he returned to Blaj, becoming canon and in 1921 rector of the theological academy. In 1936, after Alexandru Nicolescu became Metropolitan of Făgăraș and Alba Iulia, he was consecrated Bishop of Lugoj. 

In 1948, the new Communist regime outlawed his church and he was arrested in October after refusing to convert to Romanian Orthodoxy. In 1955, he was forced to live at Curtea de Argeș Monastery. He remained there in isolation until he became gravely ill and was taken to a Bucharest hospital, where he died. He was buried at the Bellu Catholic cemetery. Bălan was never tried or sentenced.

Bălan and six other prelates who were held as political prisoners during Romania's Communist rule were beatified personally by Pope Francis at Liberty Field in Blaj, Romania on 2 June 2019.

References

1880 births
1959 deaths
People from Teiuș
Romanian Greek-Catholic bishops
Romanian beatified people
Romanian anti-communist clergy
Romanian prisoners and detainees
People detained by the Securitate
Inmates of Sighet prison
Burials at Bellu Cemetery
Beatifications by Pope Francis
University of Vienna alumni
Eastern Catholic bishops in Romania